Isidro Camarillo Zavala (born 28 May 1951) is a Mexican politician formerly affiliated with the National Action Party. As of 2014 he served as Deputy of the LIX Legislature of the Mexican Congress as a plurinominal representative.

References

1951 births
Living people
Politicians from Baja California Sur
Members of the Chamber of Deputies (Mexico)
National Action Party (Mexico) politicians
21st-century Mexican politicians
Deputies of the LIX Legislature of Mexico